Acrocraniofacial dysostosis, also known as Kaplan Plauchu Fitch syndrome is a very rare hereditary disorder which is characterized by cranio-facial dysmorphisms, hearing loss, digital clubbing, and osseous anomalies. Only 2 cases have been described in medical literature.

Description 

The following is a list of the symptoms of the disorder:

Cranio-facial 

 Acrocephaly
 Hypertelorism
 Ptosis
 Proptosis
 Down-slanting palpebral fissures
 High nasal bridge
 Nostril anteversion
 Short philtrum
 Cleft palate
 Micrognathia
 Ear abnormalities
 Preauricular sinus or cyst

Auditory 

 Hearing loss

Osseous 

 Metatarsus adductus
 First brachymetacarpia
 First brachymetatarsia
 Proximally placed first toes
 Craniosynostosis
 Pectus excavatum
 Partial duplication of the thumb's distal phalanx
 Malleus and incus dysplasia
 Tall lumbar vertebrae associated with increased interpedicular distance

Discovery 

This disorder was first discovered in 1988 by Kaplan et al. when they described two sisters born to consanguineous parents with all the symptoms mentioned above. They suggested this disorder to be inherited in an autosomal recessive fashion.

References 

Disorders of fascia